Rashid Sheban Marzouk (born 30 January 1967) is a Qatari sprinter. He competed in the men's 4 × 100 metres relay at the 1988 Summer Olympics.

References

1967 births
Living people
Athletes (track and field) at the 1988 Summer Olympics
Qatari male sprinters
Qatari male hurdlers
Olympic athletes of Qatar
Place of birth missing (living people)